The Juno Awards of 2002 were presented in St. John's, Newfoundland and Labrador, Canada during the weekend of 13–14 April 2002.

Nominations were announced 11 February 2002 at a news conference hosted by Mike Bullard. Awards for the secondary categories were presented in a non-televised gala on 13 April.

The primary ceremonies were conducted on 14 April at Mile One Stadium and televised by CTV, the first time for the private broadcaster. CBC Television had previously held the broadcast rights for the primary Juno ceremonies. The telecast was hosted by members of Barenaked Ladies and attracted the highest ratings in several years (approximately 1.4 million viewers).

Diana Krall won awards three categories based on her album The Look of Love. Nickelback also won three Junos on the strength of their album Silver Side Up, whose recording engineer won an additional Juno. Daniel Lanois was inducted into the Canadian Music Hall of Fame.

Nominees and winners

Best Artist

Winner: Diana Krall

Other Nominees:
Leonard Cohen
Nelly Furtado
Garou
Amanda Marshall

Best New Solo Artist
Winner: Hawksley Workman

Other Nominees:
Gabrielle Destroismaisons
Jelleestone
Maren Ord
Thrust

Best Group
Winner: Nickelback

Other Nominees:
Matthew Good Band
Our Lady Peace
Sum 41
The Tea Party

Best New Group
Winner: Default

Other Nominees:
Joydrop
Smoother
Sugar Jones
Wave

Best Songwriter

Winner: Jann Arden,  "Never Mind", "Thing for You" (with co-songwriter Russell Broom)

Other Nominees:
Leonard Cohen, "Boogie Street", "In My Secret Life", "You Have Loved Enough" (all with co-songwriter Sharon Robinson)
Sarah Harmer, "Don't Get Your Back Up", "Hideout", "Uniform Grey"
Ron Sexsmith, "April After All" (by Elvis Costello and Anne Sofie von Otter), "Just My Heart Talking", "This Song"
Rufus Wainwright, "Cigarettes and Chocolate Milk", "Grey Gardens", "Poses"

Best Country Artist/Group
Winner: Carolyn Dawn Johnson

Other Nominees:
Paul Brandt
Lisa Brokop
Jimmy Rankin
The Wilkinsons

Best New Country Artist/Group
Winner: The Ennis Sisters

Other Nominees:
Steve Fox
Aaron Lines
J. R. Vautour
Doc Walker

Best Producer
Winner: Daniel Lanois with co-producer Brian Eno, "Beautiful Day" and "Elevation" by U2

Other Nominees:
Ben Dunk with co-producer Rick Neigher, "California" and "Think It Over" by Wave
Justin Gray, "Days Like That" and "I Got U" by Sugar Jones
Mark Makoway, "Alone in the Universe" and "Too Close to the Sun" by David Usher
Bob Rock, "Flavor of the Weak" by American Hi-Fi and "Make It Right" by Econoline Crush

Best Recording Engineer
Winner: Randy Staub, "How You Remind Me" and "Too Bad" by Nickelback

Other Nominees:
Richard Chycki,  "Jaded" by Aerosmith and "When You Know" by Shawn Colvin
Pierre Marchand,  "Evil Angel" and "Greek Song" by Rufus Wainwright
Jeff Martin and Nick Blagona, "Angels" and "Lullaby" by The Tea Party
Brad Nelson,  "Followed Her Around" and "You and Me" by Jimmy Rankin

Canadian Music Hall of Fame
Winner: Daniel Lanois

Walt Grealis Special Achievement Award
Winner: Michael Cohl

Nominated and winning albums

Best Album
Winner: The Look of Love, Diana Krall

Other Nominees:
All Killer No Filler, Sum 41
Silver Side Up, Nickelback
Spiritual Machines, Our Lady Peace
Whoa, Nelly!, Nelly Furtado

Best Blues Album
Winner: Big Mouth, Colin Linden

Other Nominees:
Breakfast at Midnight, Rita Chiarelli
Drive On, Michael Jerome Browne
Double Shot!, Mel Brown (guitarist) and Snooky Pryor
Rattlebag, Paul Reddick and The Sidemen

Best Children's Album
Winner: A Classical Kids Christmas, Susan Hammond

Other Nominees:
Call of the Wild, Aaron Burnett
Chase a Rainbow, The Just Kidding Band
Red's in the Hood, Judy & David
Songs from the Boom Box, Judy & David

Best Classical Album (Solo or Chamber Ensemble)
Winner: Bach Arrangements, Angela Hewitt

Other Nominees:
Beethoven: Sonatas for Piano & Violin, Jane Coop (piano), Andrew Dawes (violin)
Schumann: Fantasy in C Major, Marc-Andre Hamelin
Somers String Quartets, Accordes String Quartet
Transcendental Liszt, Janina Fialkowska

Best Classical Album (Large Ensemble or Soloist(s) with Large Ensemble Accompaniment)
Winner: Max Bruch, Concertos 1 & 3, James Ehnes (violin), Orchestre Symphonique de Montreal

Other Nominees:
Concert Francais, James Ehnes (violin), Orchestre Symphonique de Québec
English Piano Concerti: Britten, Rawsthorne, Ireland, Finzi, Jane Coop (piano), CBC Radio Orchestra
J.S. Bach: Art of the Fugue, Les Violons du Roy
Myaskovsky - Schinittke - Denisov, Stepan Arman (violin), I Musici de Montreal

Best Classical Album (Vocal or Choral Performance)
Winner: Airs Francais, Ben Heppner

Other Nominees:
Exsultate, Jubilate, Karina Gauvin (soprano), CBC Radio Orchestra
Forgotten Songs, Forgotten Loves, Wendy Nielsen
Handel: Sacred Arias, Daniel Taylor
Singing Somers Theatre, Monica Whicher (soprano), Robert Cram (flute), various soloists

Best Album Design
Winner: Sebastien Toupin, Benoit St-Jean, Michel Valois, Martin Tremblay, Disparu by La Chicane

Other Nominees:
Garnet Armstrong, Lionel Drew, The Audio of Being by Matthew Good Band
Carylann Loeppky, Poem by Delerium
Our Lady Peace, Catherine McRae, Oli Goldsmith, Spiritual Machines by Our Lady Peace
John Rummen, Sam Findlay, H-Wing by Kevin Hearn and Thin Buckle

Best Gospel Album
Winner: Downhere, Downhere

Other Nominees:
Imagerical, Matt Brouwer
Love Letters, Londa Larmond
Travelers, Carolyn Arends
Waiting for Aidan, Steve Bell

Best Instrumental Album
Winner: Armando's Fire, Oscar Lopez

Other Nominees:
Angel's Embrace, Dan Gibson, David Bradstreet
Fiesta Del Sol, Kenny Vehkavaara
Inspiration Classique, Richard Abel
The English Country Garden, Dan Gibson, John Herberman

Best Selling Album (Foreign or Domestic)
Winner: Hot Shot, Shaggy

Other Nominees:
All That You Can't Leave Behind, U2
Black & Blue, Backstreet Boys
Chocolate Starfish and the Hot Dog Flavored Water, Limp Bizkit
Survivor, Destiny's Child

Best Traditional Jazz Album - Instrumental
Winner: Live at the Senator, Mike Murley, Ed Bickert and Steve Wallace

Other Nominees:
And It Really Was..., The Brigham Phillips Big Band
Forgotten Memories, Don Thompson
Spectacular, Campbell Ryga
Street Culture, Paul Tobey

Best Contemporary Jazz Album - Instrumental
Winner: Live, François Bourassa Trio and Andre LeRoux

Other Nominees:
Nuage, Jeff Johnston
Of Battles Unknown Mysteries, Chris Tarry
Sigame, D.D. Jackson
The Recline, Metalwood

Best Vocal Jazz Album
Winner: The Look of Love, Diana Krall

Other Nominees:
Image in the Mirror the Triptych, Jeri Brown
I Saw the Sky, Melissa Walker
It's Wonderful, Susie Arioli Swing Band
Tribute, Emilie-Claire Barlow

Best Roots or Traditional Album - Group
Winner: Cordial, La Bottine Souriante

Other Nominees:
Petit fou, Matapat
Post Atomic Hillbilly, Undertakin' Daddies
Sin & Other Salvations, The Wyrd Sisters
Songs of Work & Freedom, The Brothers Cosmoline

Best Roots or Traditional Album - Solo
Winner: Far End of Summer, David Francey

Other Nominees:
Beyond the Storm, Eileen McGann
For a Song, Maria Dunn
Gather Honey, Penny Lang
Verchuosity, April Verch

Best Alternative Album
Winner: Poses, Rufus Wainwright

Other Nominees:
Constantines, The Constantines
Down at the Khyber, The Joel Plaskett Emergency
(Last Night We Were) The Delicious Wolves, Hawksley Workman
Night of the Shooting Stars, Rheostatics

Best Selling Francophone Album
Winner: Les vents ont changé, Kevin Parent

Other Nominees:
Cordial, La Bottine Souriante
Disparu, La Chicane
Du coq à l'âme, Lynda Lemay
Etc..., Gabrielle Destroismaisons

Best Pop Album
Winner: Morning Orbit, David Usher

Other Nominees:
Girl Versions, Emm Gryner
Open, Cowboy Junkies
Saturday People, Prozzäk
Ten New Songs, Leonard Cohen

Best Rock Album
Winner: Silver Side Up, Nickelback

Other Nominees:
All Killer No Filler, Sum 41
Brothers and Sisters, Are You Ready?, Big Sugar
Pretty Together, Sloan
Purge, Bif Naked

Nominated and winning releases

Best Single
Winner: "How You Remind Me", Nickelback

Other Nominees:
 "California", Wave
 "Everybody's Got A Story", Amanda Marshall
 "If It Feels Good Do It", Sloan
 "Life", Our Lady Peace

Best Music of Aboriginal Canada Recording
Winner: On and On, Eagle & Hawk

Other Nominees:
Crazy Maker, Marcel Gagnon
Dark Realm, Nakoda Lodge
My Ojibway Experience, Strength & Hope, Billy Joe Green
Riel's Road, Sandy Scofield

Best Classical Composition
Winner: "Par-ci, par-la", Chan Ka Nin, Nouveaux Territoires by Ensemble Contemporain de Montréal

Other Nominees:
"Concerto for Viola and Orchestra", Peter Paul Koprowski, Redemption: Peter Paul Koprowski Concerti
"Love Songs", Owen Underhill, Celestial Machine
"Serinette", Harry Somers, Serinette
"Suite for Klezmer Band and Orchestra", Sid Robinovitch, Klezmer Suite: Music of Sid Robinovitch

Best Dance Recording
Winner: "Spaced Invader", Hatiras

Other Nominees:
"Absolutely Not", Deborah Cox
"Innocente", Delerium
"It Doesn't Matter", The Underdog Project
"The Light", Elissa

Best Rap Recording
Winner: Bad Dreams, Swollen Members

Other Nominees:
"Easy to Slip", Solitair
Quest for Fire: Firestarter, Vol. 1, Kardinal Offishall
Jelleestone Thirteen, Jelleestone
"Still Too Much", Ghetto Concept with Snow, Kardinal Offishall, Maestro, Red-One, and Ironside

Best R&B/Soul Recording
Winner: "Don't You Forget It", Glenn Lewis

Other Nominees:
"Day Dreaming", Chin Injeti
"Never Leave Hurt Alone", Sugar Jones
"The Day Before", Baby Blue Soundcrew featuring Jully Black, Baby Cham
"Unforgettable", Jamie Sparks

Best Reggae Recording
Winner: "Love (African Woman)", Blessed

Other Nominees:
"A Friend for Life", Iley Dread
"Breathe", Sonia Collymore
"Never Let Jah Go", Chester Miller
"They Called Me Madness", Peculiar I

Best Global Album
Winner: The Journey, Alpha Yaya Diallo

Other Nominees:
Alma De Santiago, Jane Bunnett
Distant Wind, Mei Han, Randy Raine-Reusch
Havana Remembered, Hilario Durán
Kashish Attraction, Kiran Ahluwalia

Best Video
Winner: Sean Michael Turrell, "Jealous of Your Cigarette" by Hawksley Workman

Other Nominees:
Oli Goldsmith, "In Repair" by Our Lady Peace
Josh Levy, "I Hear You Calling" by Gob
Stephen Scott, "Plumb Song" by Snow
Floria Sigismondi, "In My Secret Life" by Leonard Cohen

References

External links
Juno Awards site

2002
2002 music awards
2002 in Canadian music
2002 in Newfoundland and Labrador
April 2002 events in Canada
Music festivals in St. John's, Newfoundland and Labrador